Báječná léta pod psa (English - Those Wonderful Years That Sucked) is a 1997 movie, adapted from the book of the same title by Michal Viewegh. The film is directed by Petr Nikolaev.

Plot 
It's the beginning of the 1960s in Czechoslovakia where the heavy impact of the Soviet Union influences all the happenings in the country. A young mother, played by Libuše Šafránková and a father, played by Ondřej Vetchý, are expecting their first baby. They have already agreed on a name - Quido. The baby is due to be born on August 5, but because nothing happens as planned, Quido is born earlier, during the performance Waiting for Godot written by Samuel Beckett. This might have influenced his life because since that moment he seems to be a genius boy. Of course his intelligence makes him trouble during his teenage years at school and also during his attempts to get a girlfriend. Eventually he manages to pick the right one.

For Quido everything suddenly looks wonderful, when another disaster comes. His father starts to suffer from persecution mania after he has been degraded from his job and asked to come to a police interrogation. He changes completely and thinks that the situation becomes unbearable. That's why he is making himself a coffin. Quido's mother feels desperate and comes with an idea which could save her husband. She wants Quido to have his own baby so that her husband could see the world from a better perspective again.

Eventually the whole situation is saved not only by Quido's child, but mainly by The Velvet Revolution in 1989.
As a result, Quido's father starts to feel much better. The whole atmosphere is then interrupted by the fact that it becomes more and more obvious that the situation hasn't changed that much.

Cast list 
Libuše Šafránková as Quido's mother
Ondřej Vetchý as Quido's father
Jan Zahálka as Quido - young boy
Jakub Wehrenberg as Quido - young man
Klára Botková as Jaruška - young girl
Jitka Ježková as Jaruška - young woman
Vladimír Javorský as Šperk
Vilma Cibulková as Šperková
Miriam Kantorková as grandmother Věra
Vladimír Dlouhý as Zvára
Květa Fialová as grandmother Líba
Stanislav Zindulka as grandfather Josef
Otakar Brousek Sr. as dědeček Jiří
Viktor Preiss as playwright
Jiří Schmitzer as Dr. Liehr
Alice Bendová as Zita
Miloň Čepelka as gateman

References

External links
 

1997 films
1997 drama films
1990s Czech-language films
Films set in 1963
Films set in 1989
Czech drama films